Kahoot! is a Norwegian game-based learning platform, used as educational technology. It has learning games, also known as "kahoots", are user-generated multiple-choice quizzes that can be accessed via a web browser or the Kahoot! app. Kahoot! also includes trivia quizzes. This educational platform is similar to other technological learning tools such as Wooflash, Blooket, Quizizz, Gimkit, or Quizlet.

History and development
Kahoot! was founded in 2012 by Johan Brand, Jamie Brooker, and Morten Versvik in a joint project with the Norwegian University of Science and Technology. They collaborated with Professor Alf Inge Wang and were later joined by Norwegian entrepreneur Åsmund Furuseth. Kahoot! was launched in a private beta at SXSWedu in March 2013, and the beta was released to the public in September 2013.

In 2017, Kahoot! had raised $26.5 million in funding from Northzone, Creandum and Microsoft Ventures. In October 11, 2018, Kahoot! was valued at $300 million. As of 11 June 2020, Kahoot! was valued at $1.5 billion and raised further capital from Northzone. In 2019, Kahoot! acquired the Scandinavian education company Poio. It also acquired DragonBox, an educational games developer, for $18 million. Kahoot! raised $28 million in venture capital investments the following June. Kahoot! raised an additional $215 million in venture capital funding from SoftBank in October 2020.

Afterwards, Kahoot! made a series of acquisitions. It acquired Drops, which was focused on teaching languages, for about $50 million. This was followed by Whiteboard.fi, which develops software for digital, online whiteboards. Kahoot! also acquired the Danish startup Actimo for approximately $33 million. Actimo developed software for training and engaging with employees. It was acquired to expand Kahoot's features for business users. In April 2021, Kahoot! acquired Motimate, a corporate learning company based in Norway, for about $25 million. In 2021, Kahoot! announced that it would acquire SSO digital learning platform Clever, Inc. for $500 million to expand Clever Inc.'s reach globally.

Kahoot's user base grew more than 40 percent from 2020 to 2021. In March 2021, the company went public on the Oslo stock exchange. In 2021, Kahoot! announced that it would acquire SSO digital learning platform Clever, Inc. for $500 million to expand Clever Inc.'s reach globally.

Software and services 
Kahoot! users gather around a common screen such as an interactive whiteboard, projector, or a computer monitor. The site can also be used through screen-sharing tools, like Zoom or Google Hangouts. The game design is such that the players are required to frequently look up from their devices. All players connect using a generated game PIN shown on the common screen, and use a device to answer questions.

In March 2017, Kahoot! reached one billion cumulative participating players. In September 2017, Kahoot! launched a mobile application for homework.

Research and prototypes 
The game concept used in Kahoot! started out as an idea of Professor Alf Inge Wang, at the Department for Computer Science at the Norwegian University of Science and Technology in 2006. He developed multiple prototypes that were developed and tested in experiments conducted in collaboration with master students. The idea was to transform the classroom, where the teacher acted as the game show host, and the students were contenders, using their own mobile devices. The initial prototype was named Lecture Quiz.

Lecture Quiz 1.0 was developed in 2006, before modern smartphones were available (the first generation iPhone was released June 29, 2007). The server was implemented in Java and MySQL, integrated with an Apache Web server. The teacher client was implemented as a Java application, in combination with OpenGL for graphics, while the student clients were implemented on Java 2 Micro Edition. This made it possible to run the client on both mobile phones and laptops. The students who played the game using their own laptops could use the Wi-Fi available at the university, while those playing using mobile phones had to use 3G over the cellular network. The latter was a disadvantage, as the students had to pay out of their own pocket to play Lecture Quiz, as the telecom providers at that time charged per megabyte transferred. The first experiment with Lecture Quiz was carried out in a classroom with twenty students at the Norwegian University of Science and Technology, where the focus was on efficiency and usefulness. The results from the experiment showed that Lecture Quiz was relatively easy to use, and contributed to increased learning. They also found that it was entertaining for both the teacher and students, and increased the motivation for attending more lectures. From 2006 to 2011, four versions of Lecture Quiz were developed, where the main changes were related to improved usability, thus making it easier to create quizzes, and using newer technology for implementation.

Lecture Quiz 2.0 was the first prototype where both teacher and student clients had web-interfaces. An experiment testing the 2.0 prototype showed that the usability had been improved both for the teacher and the student clients, and that the concept increased students' motivation, engagement, concentration, and perceived learning. The last version of Lecture Quiz was version 3.0, with significantly improved user-interface implemented using HTML 5 and CSS3, avatars, and multiple game/team modes. Lecture Quiz 3.0 was tested internally at the NTNU, as well as externally at various schools such as at Skaun Ungdomsskole, where the students rejoiced over having a test in social science.

Since Kahoot! was launched in 2013, the research community has conducted many experiments related to the effects of using the game-based learning platform in classrooms. A quasi-experiment conducted at the Norwegian University of Science and Technology with 252 students participating investigated the wear-out effect of Kahoot!, by comparing students' perception of the system after playing once, vs. playing frequently over five months. The results did not show any statistically significant reductions in students' engagement, motivation, concentration, or perceived learning over time, but there was a significant change in classroom dynamics (less communication among players after five months). The conclusion was that Kahoot! managed to boost students' engagement, motivation, concentration, and learning after using it repeatedly for five months. The core factor to keep students' attention after heavy repeated usage was found to be the competitive nature of Kahoot!.

There is also research that investigates how Kahoot! performs compared to other tools and platforms. In a quasi-experiment with 384 students at the Norwegian University of Science and Technology, Kahoot! was compared to using a paper quiz and a simple polling system called Clicker. The results show statistically significant improvement in motivation, engagement, enjoyment, and concentration for the gamified approach (Kahoot!) compared to the two others. However, the results did not show any significant differences in learning outcomes.

Another quasi-experiment at the Norwegian University of Science and Technology, in which 593 students participated, investigated how the use of points and audio in Kahoot! affects concentration, engagement, enjoyment, learning, motivation, and classroom dynamics. The results reveal that there are some significant differences whether audio and points are used in the areas of concentration, engagement, enjoyment, and motivation. The worst result was for the case where both audio and points were turned off. The most surprising finding was how classroom dynamics was positively affected by the use of audio.

According to research by two students at the Norwegian University of Science and Technology, the network latency in accessing the website greatly influences the quality of experience of the platform, in both longitudinal and cross-sectional studies, with a sample size N=21. It was found that about 70% of the sample size regard Kahoot! as having positive results on all delay levels, while a varying number of students (between 10-20%) report that the platform is too time-consuming, forming a direct relationship with the duration of the delay.

A literature review containing 93 studies on the effect of using Kahoot! for learning was published in the journal Computers & Education in 2020. This is the first literature review that investigates most published studies (experiments, case studies, surveys, etc.) on how using Kahoot! affects learning in the classroom. The focus of the review is on learning performance, classroom dynamics, students' and teachers' attitudes and perceptions, and student anxiety. The main conclusion is that Kahoot! has a positive effect on learning performance, classroom dynamics, attitudes, and anxiety, and the main challenges include "technical problems", "seeing questions and answers", "time stress", "fear of losing", and "it being hard to catch up". Studies included in this review use a mixture of quantitative and qualitative research methods, that reveal, among other things, that Kahoot! creates statistically significant improvement in learning performance compared to traditional teaching and other tools, on students’ and teachers’ perception of lectures, in classroom dynamics, and that Kahoot! can reduce students’ anxiety compared to traditional teaching and other tools.

In 2016, Kahoot!'s pedagogical quality was evaluated and certified by Education Alliance Finland (formerly Kokoa Standard). The quality certification is based on a qualitative assessment of the product's design. The assessment was done and developed by Education Alliance Finland in collaboration with Lauri Hietajärvi and Erika Maksniemi, researchers from the University of Helsinki. The evaluation suggests that Kahoot!'s educational value is highest when students are creating quizzes of relevant topics themselves, because it uses creativity, and practices 21st century skills.

References 

Educational technology
Educational technology companies of Norway
Norwegian educational websites
Internet properties established in 2013